Mutton is a surname. Notable people with the surname include:

 Brice Mutton (1890–1949), Australian politician
 Guy Mutton (born 1976), Australian singer
 John Mutton (born 1947), English politician
 Kirby Mutton (born 1984), Australian netball player
 Lerryn Mutton (1924–2015), Australian politician and son of Brice Mutton

Fictional characters:
 Les Mutton, character in the television series Zeroman